The first world record in the 400 metres individual medley in long course (50 metres) swimming was recognized by the International Swimming Federation (FINA) in 1957, followed by the women a year later. In the short course (25 metres) swimming events the world's governing body recognizes world records since March 3, 1991.

Men

Long course

Short course

Women

Long course

Short course

All-time top 25

Men long course
Correct as of July 2022

Notes
Below is a list of other times equal or superior to 4:10.49:
Michael Phelps also swam 4:05.25 (2008), 4:06.22 (2007), 4:07.82 (2008), 4:07.89 (2012), 4:08.26 (2004), 4:08.41 (2004), 4:09.09 (2003), 4:09.28 (2012), 4:10.16 (2006), 4:10.47 (2006).
Ryan Lochte also swam 4:06.08 (2008), 4:06.40 (2009), 4:07.01 (2009), 4:07.06 (2012), 4:07.13 (2011), 4:07.59 (2010), 4:08.09 (2008), 4:08.77 (2010), 4:09.74 (2007), 4:09.98 (2010), 4:10.33 (2008).
Chase Kalisz also swam 4:06.75 (2016), 4:06.99 (2017), 4:07.47 (2022), 4:07.95 (2018), 4:08.12 (2016), 4:08.25 (2018), 4:08.92 (2018), 4:09.09 (2021), 4:09.22 (2013), 4:09.42 (2021), 4:09.43 (2017), 4:09.54 (2016), 4:09.62 (2014), 4:09.65 (2021), 4:09.67 (2017), 4:09.79 (2017), 4:10.05 (2015), 4:10.09 (2022), 4:10.32 (2022).
Tyler Clary also swam 4:07.31 (2009), 4:09.03 (2014), 4:09.20 (2010), 4:09.51 (2014), 4:09.55 (2010), 4:09.92 (2012), 4:10.04 (2009), 4:10.39 (2013).
László Cseh also swam 4:07.37 (2009), 4:07.96 (2008), 4:09.26 (2008), 4:09.59 (2008), 4:09.63 (2005), 4:09.86 (2006), 4:10.10 (2005), 4:10.33 (2009).
Kosuke Hagino also swam 4:07.61 (2013), 4:07.75 (2014), 4:07.88 (2014), 4:08.31 (2014), 4:08.54 (2015), 4:08.85 (2016), 4:08.90 (2016), 4:08.94 (2012), 4:09.06 (2016), 4:09.52 (2016), 4:09.62 (2014), 4:09.80 (2016), 4:09.82 (2014), 4:10.00 (2016), 4:10.01 (2012), 4:10.26 (2012), 4:10.30 (2018), 4:10.45 (2017).
Daiya Seto also swam 4:07.95 (2019), 4:07.99 (2017), 4:08.47 (2016), 4:08.50 (2015), 4:08.69 (2013), 4:08.79 (2018), 4:08.95 (2019), 4:08.98 (2018), 4:09.02 (2021), 4:09.07 (2022), 4:09.14 (2017), 4:09.25 (2019), 4:09.62 (2019), 4:09.71 (2016), 4:09.88 (2021), 4:09.98 (2019), 4:10.04 (2015, 2019), 4:10.10 (2012), 4:10.14 (2022), 4:10.17 (2016), 4:10.18 (2017), 4:10.21 (2014), 4:10.22 (2017), 4:10.30 (2019), 4:10.39 (2014), 4:10.44 (2017).
Dávid Verrasztó also swam 4:08.38 (2017), 4:09.57 (2021), 4:09.80 (2021), 4:09.90 (2015), 4:10.01 (2017), 4:10.21 (2017).
Carson Foster also swam 4:08.46 (2021), 4:09.33 (2022), 4:09.60 (2022).
Léon Marchand also swam 4:09.09 (2022), 4:09.65 (2021), 4:10.09 (2021), 4:10.38 (2022).
Jay Litherland also swam 4:09.31 (2017), 4:09.91 (2021), 4:10.21 (2018), 4:10.28 (2021), 4:10.33 (2021).
Thiago Pereira also swam 4:09.48 (2013).
Lewis Clareburt also swam 4:09.49 (2021), 4:09.87 (2021).
Ilya Borodin also swam 4:09.86 (2022), 4:10.02 (2021).
Brendon Smith also swam 4:10.04 (2021), 4:10.15 (2022), 4:10.38 (2021).
Wang Shun also swam 4:10.13 (2019).
Max Litchfield also swam 4:10.20 (2021).
Luca Marin also swam 4:10.22 (2008).

Men short course
Correct as of December 2022

Notes
Below is a list of other times equal or superior to 4:01.63:
Daiya Seto also swam 3:55.53 (2019), 3:55.75 (2022), 3:56.26 (2021), 3:56.33 (2014), 3:56.43 (2018), 3:57.25 (2018), 3:57.66 (2017), 3:57.85 (2021), 3:58.20 (2017), 3:58.65 (2021), 3:58.84 (2013), 3:59.01 (2021), 3:59.15 (2012), 3:59.20 (2014), 3:59.24 (2016), 4:00.35 (2022), 4:00.49 (2021), 4:00.84 (2021).
Carson Foster also swam 3:57.99 (2021), 4:01.34 (2022).
Thomas Fraser-Holmes also swam 3:58.69 (2014).
Ilya Borodin also swam 3:58.83 (2021), 3:59.57 (2021).
László Cseh also swam 3:59.33 (2007), 4:00.37 (2005).
Alberto Razzetti also swam 4:00.34 (2021), 4:00.45 (2022), 4:01.57 (2021).
Brendon Smith also swam 4:01.11 (2022).
Kosuke Hagino also swam 4:01.17 (2014).

Women long course
Correct as of December 2022

Notes
Below is a list of other times equal or superior to 4:34.17:
Katinka Hosszú also swam 4:28.58 (2016), 4:29.33 (2017), 4:29.89 (2016), 4:30.31 (2009), 4:30.39 (2015, 2019), 4:30.41 (2013), 4:30.75 (2016), 4:30.90 (2016), 4:30.97 (2016), 4:31.03 (2014), 4:31.07 (2015), 4:31.53 (2014), 4:31.93 (2015), 4:32.25 (2016), 4:32.30 (2019), 4:32.33 (2016), 4:32.52 (2019), 4:32.68 (2016), 4:32.72 (2013), 4:32.78 (2015), 4:32.83 (2012), 4:32.87 (2019), 4:33.06 (2019), 4:33.49 (2012), 4:33.76 (2012), 4:33.77 (2012, 2019), 4:33.80 (2014), 4:33.81 (2017), 4:33.83 (2019), 4:33.88 (2015), 4:33.90 (2017), 4:34.04 (2015), 4:34.12 (2017), 4:34.14 (2016, 2016), 4:34.16 (2015), 4:34.17 (2015).
Summer McIntosh also swam 4:29.01 (2022), 4:29.12 (2022), 4:32.04 (2022).
Ye Shiwen also swam 4:30.84 (2014), 4:31.59 (2013), 4:31.73 (2012), 4:32.07 (2019), 4:32.97 (2014), 4:33.66 (2011), 4:33.79 (2010).
Yui Ohashi also swam 4:31.42 (2017), 4:32.08 (2021), 4:32.33 (2019), 4:33.02 (2019), 4:33.77 (2018), 4:33.81 (2019).
Stephanie Rice also swam 4:31.46 (2008), 4:32.29 (2009), 4:33.45 (2012).
Elizabeth Beisel also swam 4:31.68 (2012), 4:31.69 (2013), 4:31.74 (2012), 4:31.78 (2011), 4:31.99 (2014), 4:32.87 (2008), 4:32.98 (2014), 4:33.52 (2014), 4:33.55 (2016), 4:34.04 (2010).
Maya DiRado also swam 4:31.71 (2015), 4:32.70 (2013), 4:33.50 (2016), 4:33.73 (2016).
Katie Hoff also swam 4:31.71 (2008), 4:32.89 (2007).
Hannah Miley also swam 4:31.76 (2014), 4:32.16 (2015), 4:32.54 (2016), 4:32.67 (2012), 4:32.72 (2009), 4:33.09 (2010), 4:33.24 (2008), 4:33.25 (2014), 4:33.40 (2016), 4:33.51 (2015), 4:33.74 (2016), 4:34.12 (2017), 4:34.16 (2013), 4:34.17 (2012).
Kirsty Coventry also swam 4:32.12 (2009), 4:32.15 (2009).
Mireia Belmonte also swam 4:32.17 (2017), 4:32.39 (2016), 4:32.75 (2016), 4:32.92 (2014), 4:33.13 (2014), 4:33.42 (2016), 4:33.91 (2012).
Kaylee McKeown also swam 4:32.73 (2020).
Li Xuanxu also swam 4:32.91 (2012).
Emma Weyant also swam 4:33.55 (2021), 4:33.81 (2021).
Aimee Willmott also swam 4:33.64 (2014), 4:33.66 (2015), 4:34.08 (2016).
Melanie Margalis also swam 4:34.08 (2021).

Women short course
Correct as of December 2022

Notes
Below is a list of other times equal or superior to 4:26.52:
Katinka Hosszú also swam 4:19.75 (2015), 4:19.82 (2017), 4:20.83 (2014), 4:20.85 (2013), 4:21.05 (2014), 4:21.21 (2015), 4:21.40 (2018), 4:21.67 (2016), 4:21.91 (2018), 4:22.05 (2017), 4:22.06 (2014), 4:22.18 (2013), 4:22.94 (2014), 4:23.55 (2018), 4:23.59 (2018), 4:23.66 (2014), 4:23.67 (2014), 4:23.91 (2012), 4:24.02 (2018), 4:24.37 (2011), 4:24.69 (2013), 4:24.78 (2017), 4:25.03 (2016), 4:25.10 (2019), 4:25.13 (2016), 4:25.15 (2018), 4:25.18 (2017), 4:25.24 (2019), 4:25.33 (2014), 4:25.66 (2014), 4:25.68 (2018), 4:25.69 (2016), 4:25.88 (2017), 4:25.95 (2012), 4:25.97 (2013), 4:26.32 (2019).
Mireia Belmonte also swam 4:19.86 (2014), 4:21.23 (2013), 4:22.55 (2017), 4:22.68 (2014), 4:24.21 (2010), 4:24.55 (2011), 4:24.58 (2013), 4:25.06 (2008), 4:25.23 (2013), 4:25.85 (2014), 4:26.16 (2014).
Yui Ohashi also swam 4:23.25 (2020), 4:24.03 (2017), 4:24.87 (2020), 4:25.53 (2020), 4:25.84 (2020), 4:26.13 (2020).
Hannah Miley also swam 4:23.47 (2012), 4:24.51 (2009), 4:24.74 (2014), 4:25.66 (2009), 4:26.06 (2011).
Melanie Margalis also swam 4:24.46 (2019), 4:25.48 (2020), 4:25.84 (2018).
Ye Shiwen alsow swam 4:24.55 (2010).
Sydney Pickrem also swam 4:24.84 (2020), 4:25.90 (2020).
Julia Smit also swam 4:25.87 (2008).
Bailey Andison also swam 4:26.39 (2021).
Summer McIntosh also swam 4:26.44 (2021).
Hali Flickinger also swam 4:26.51 (2022).

References

External links
  Zwemkroniek
  Agenda Diana

Individual medley 400 metres
World record progression 400 metres individual medley